Bonnetia is a genus of flowering plants in the family Bonnetiaceae. Most of the roughly 30 species are shrubs. The remaining species, all trees, are among the dominant species in the forest vegetation on the tepui plateaus of northern South America, such as B. roraimae on the summit of Mount Roraima.

Species
Bonnetia contains the following species:

Bonnetia ahogadoi (Steyerm.) A.L.Weitzman & P.F.Stevens
Bonnetia anceps Mart. & Zucc.
Bonnetia bahiensis Turcz.
Bonnetia bolivarensis Steyerm.
Bonnetia celiae Maguire
Bonnetia chimantensis Steyerm.
Bonnetia cordifolia Maguire
Bonnetia crassa Gleason
Bonnetia cubensis (Britton) Howard
Bonnetia euryanthera Steyerm.
Bonnetia fasciculata P.F.Stevens & A.L.Weitzman
Bonnetia holostyla Huber
Bonnetia huberiana Steyerm.
Bonnetia jauaensis Maguire
Bonnetia kathleenae Lasser
Bonnetia katleeniae Lasser
Bonnetia lanceifolia Kobuski
Bonnetia liesneri Steyerm.
Bonnetia maguireorum Steyerm.
Bonnetia multinervia (Maguire) Steyerm.
Bonnetia neblinae Maguire
Bonnetia paniculata Spruce ex Benth.
Bonnetia ptariensis Steyerm.
Bonnetia roraimae Oliveri
Bonnetia roseiflora Maguire
Bonnetia rubicunda (Sastre) A.L.Weitzman & P.F.Stevens
Bonnetia sessilis Benth.
Bonnetia steyermarkii Kobuski
Bonnetia stricta Mart.
Bonnetia tepuiensis Kobuski & Steyerm.
Bonnetia tristyla Gleason
Bonnetia venulosa Mart. & Zucc.
Bonnetia wurdackii Maguire

References

External links

 
Malpighiales genera
Taxonomy articles created by Polbot
Taxa named by Joseph Gerhard Zuccarini
Flora of the Tepuis